Gregory Rokosh (born 24 January 1942) is a Canadian rower. He competed in the men's coxless four event at the 1972 Summer Olympics.

References

1942 births
Living people
Canadian male rowers
Olympic rowers of Canada
Rowers at the 1972 Summer Olympics
Sportspeople from Flin Flon